Beach sepak takraw competition at the 2014 Asian Beach Games was held in Phuket, Thailand from 16 to 23 November 2014 at Patong Beach.

Medalists

Medal table

Results

Men's trios

Preliminary round

Group A

Group B

Knockout round

Men's regu

Preliminary round

Group A

Group B

Knockout round

Men's team regu

Women's trios

Women's regu

Preliminary round

Group A

Group B

Knockout round

Women's team regu

References

External links 
 

2014 Asian Beach Games events
2014